The Selfish Giant is a 2013 British drama film directed by Clio Barnard. It is inspired by the Oscar Wilde short story "The Selfish Giant".

Plot
Arbor and Swifty are two teenage boys growing up in a poor and run down area of Bradford in West Yorkshire. Arbor suffers from hyperactivity disorder, which often gets him into trouble even when it is not his intention. When the boys are suspended from school after a fight, they decide to earn money collecting and selling scrap metal. They quickly realize that stealing copper from telecom, railway, and power utilities can be lucrative.

They sell their scrap to a local scrap dealer, Kitten, who owns at least two horses and competes in amateur harness racing. Kitten allows Swifty to work with the horse, once he realizes Swifty's surprising affection for and natural talent with horses. Kitten also lets the boys rent a horse and a cart to collect scrap metal.

Arbor is envious of Kitten's kindness toward Swifty. Arbor decides to steal pieces of scrap from Kitten and sell them, along with some other scrap, to a dealer in Huddersfield. The plan ends up backfiring; Arbor is refused entrance at the other dealer, and when he makes a deal with some men who offer to sell the scrap for him, they recognize it as stolen and keep the money. Kitten finds out and physically intimidates Arbor into stealing a specific piece of high voltage electric power transmission wire to make up for his loss. The boys are not fully aware of the dangers of high voltage wire. Arbor cuts the wire and Swifty helps to lift it, but is electrocuted and killed.

Arbor is devastated and Kitten is arrested, telling the police he is responsible and allowing Arbor to escape blame. Arbor sits resolutely outside Swifty's mother's house. After several rejections, his own mother finds him and takes him home. He refuses any contact by hiding under his bed, until Swifty’s mother finally comes to him.

In a final scene, Arbor takes care of the horse Swifty adored.

Cast
 Conner Chapman as Arbor
 Shaun Thomas as Swifty
 Sean Gilder as Kitten
 Lorraine Ashbourne as Mary
 Ian Burfield as Mick Brazil
 Steve Evets as Price Drop Swift
 Siobhan Finneran as Mrs. Swift
 Ralph Ineson as Johnny Jones
 Rebecca Manley as Michelle 'Shelly' Fenton
 Rhys McCoy as Daniel
 Elliott Tittensor as Martin Fenton

Awards and reception
The Selfish Giant was screened in the Directors' Fortnight section at the 2013 Cannes Film Festival where it won the Europa Cinemas award. It was also nominated for the 2013 Lux Prize. The film was screened in the Contemporary World Cinema section at the 2013 Toronto International Film Festival. It won Best Film at the 24th Stockholm International Film Festival in November 2013. Peter Bradshaw of The Guardian gave the film five out of five stars.

The film was nominated for the 2014 BAFTA for Best British Film.

References

External links
 
 

2013 films
2013 drama films
Films set in the 2000s
British drama films
Films based on works by Oscar Wilde
Films set in Bradford
Films about poverty in the United Kingdom
Films directed by Clio Barnard
2010s English-language films
2010s British films